Luis de Urquijo y Landecho, 2nd Marquess of Bolarque (28 January 1899 – 7 July 1975) was a Spanish diplomat, banker and businessman who served as a Spanish ambassador to West Germany from 12 May 1959 until 19 November 1964. He was also the 6th president of Real Madrid from 16 May 1926 to 1930. De Urquijo was born in Madrid.

References

1899 births
1975 deaths
Businesspeople from Madrid
Spanish diplomats
20th-century Spanish businesspeople
Spanish bankers
Real Madrid CF presidents